Laccotrephes pfeiferiae is a species of water scorpion belonging to the family Nepidae. It was until 1999 considered synonym of Laccotrephes robustus; records of L. robustus outside the Philippines refer to this species.

Description
Body color varies from brown to dark brown.

Distribution
This species can be found in Myanmar, Thailand, West Malaysia, Indonesia (Sumatra, Java), southern China, and Taiwan.

References

External links
 

Hemiptera of Asia
Insects of China
Insects of Indonesia
Insects of Malaysia
Insects of Myanmar
Insects of Taiwan
Insects of Thailand
Insects described in 1888
Nepidae